Kjetil Korbu Nilsen (born 23 July 1971) is a Norwegian ice sledge hockey player. He won medals for Norway at the 1994 Winter Paralympics, 1998 Winter Paralympics, 2002 Winter Paralympics, 2006 Winter Paralympics and 2010 Winter Paralympics.

References

1971 births
Living people
Norwegian sledge hockey players
Paralympic sledge hockey players of Norway
Paralympic bronze medalists for Norway
Paralympic silver medalists for Norway
Paralympic gold medalists for Norway
Paralympic medalists in sledge hockey
Ice sledge hockey players at the 1994 Winter Paralympics
Ice sledge hockey players at the 1998 Winter Paralympics
Ice sledge hockey players at the 2002 Winter Paralympics
Ice sledge hockey players at the 2006 Winter Paralympics
Medalists at the 1994 Winter Paralympics
Medalists at the 1998 Winter Paralympics
Medalists at the 2002 Winter Paralympics
Medalists at the 2006 Winter Paralympics
20th-century Norwegian people
21st-century Norwegian people